Aaron Drewe (born 8 February 2001) is an English professional footballer who plays as a defender for Championship side Queens Park Rangers.

Career
Drewe joined Queens Park Rangers aged nine years old, and has represented QPR throughout all youth levels.

In November 2019, Drewe joined National League South side Chelmsford City on a one-month loan deal. He made just one appearance for Chelmsford, coming in the Essex Senior Cup.

In October 2020, Drewe joined National League South side Oxford City on loan.

On 8 January 2022, Drewe made his professional debut for Queens Park Rangers as an extra-time substitute in a penalty shootout victory over Rotherham United in the FA Cup.

On 25 January 2022, Drewe joined National League side Weymouth on loan.

References

External links

Profile at Aylesbury United
Profile at Queens Park Rangers

2001 births
Living people
English footballers
Association football defenders
Queens Park Rangers F.C. players
Chelmsford City F.C. players
Oxford City F.C. players
Weymouth F.C. players
National League (English football) players